Colleen Young may refer to:

 Colleen Young (politician), Canadian provincial politician
 Colleen Young (swimmer), American swimmer